The Australian national quidditch team is the official quidditch team of Australia. The team is regulated by Australian Quidditch Association and is a national member of the International Quidditch Association. Australia made its debut in 2012 at the IQA Summer Games in Oxford, UK.

History
The national team made its debut in 2012 at the International Quidditch Association (IQA) Summer Games in Oxford, UK.

The Australian National Team 'The Drop Bears' competed at the IQA Global Games in 2012 and 2014, coming third and second respectively.

The Dropbears claimed Gold in the 2016 IQA World Cup, defeating the United States 150*-130 with a snitch catch. This historic win took the international quidditch community by storm, being a significant upset against Team USA who were previously undefeated in the entire history of the sport. Australia defeated teams including Germany, France and Canada to qualify for the World Cup Final.

The 2016 World Champion Dropbears squad was coached by Gen Gibson, and captained by James Mortenson.

Competitive record

{| class="wikitable" style="font-size:90%"
! Competition !! Position
|-
|  2012 Summer Games || 3rd of 5
|-
|  2014 Global Games || 2nd of 7
|-
|  2016 World Cup || 1st of 21
|-
|  2018 World Cup || 5th of 29
|
|  2022 World Cup || 3rd of}

See also

 Australian Quidditch Association
 International Quidditch Association
 Sport in Australia
 Quidditch (sport)

References

External links

Quidditch national teams
Quidditch
Sports clubs established in 2011
2011 establishments in Australia